Claudio Herrera Casanova (born February 11, 1988) is a Uruguayan footballer who plays as a defender for River Plate.

Career
Herrera began his career in 2010 with River Plate Montevideo, where he played for five seasons, until now.

References

1988 births
Living people
Uruguayan footballers
Club Atlético River Plate (Montevideo) players
Association football defenders
Uruguayan Primera División players
Footballers from Montevideo